Oka is a small village on the northern bank of the Ottawa River (Rivière des Outaouais in French), northwest of Montreal, Quebec, Canada. Located in the Laurentians valley on Lake of Two Mountains, where the Ottawa has its confluence with the St. Lawrence River, the town is connected via Quebec Route 344. It is located 50 km (30 miles) west of Montreal.

The area was first established in 1721 by Roman Catholic Sulpician Fathers as a mission to serve the needs of Mohawk, Algonquin and Nipissing converts as well as of French settlers. In 1730, the mission site was moved about 1.5 km west along the shore to Pointe d'Oka (Oka's Point) close to where the first stone church was built in 1733, and around which church evolved the village that eventually became known as Oka. The Mohawks had been assigned to a west-side village that eventually became known as Kanesatake whereas the Algonquins and Nipissings had been assigned to an adjacent east-side village. Kanesatake's status is as interim land base within the meaning of the Constitution Act, 1867, and not as indian reserve within the meaning of the Indian Act.

History

Pre-crisis habitation 
Oka is historically connected to the Sulpicians' two first Amerindian missions on Montreal island, the initial mission of La Montagne established in 1676 that was moved to Sault-au-Récollets mission established in 1696. This culminated in the King of France in 1718 granting the Sulpicians a concession named seigneurie du Lac-des-Deux-Montagnes with the view to relocating the Sault-au-Récollets Amerindian converts to new mission facilities located east of the Ottawa River at the confluence with Lac-des-Deux-Montagnes.

The move from the Sault-au-Récollet mission to the Lac-des-Deux-Montagnes mission started in 1721 and was completed the next year. The Sulpicians' seigneurie du Lac-des-Deux-Montagnes was conditional on the Indians not abandoning the lands, failing which they would revert to the Crown, and was subject to the Sulpicians being indemnified by being given proprietorship of the land because of the need to construct a fort. Final concession was given in 1718. In 1721, under the direction of the Sulpician Maurice Quéré de Tréguron,  Algonquin and Iroquois groups relocated on the north shore of Lac-des-Deux-Montagnes and on the east shore of the Ottawa River.
 
The chosen site was advantageous for the conversion of the Indians and for their defense and that of the colony. To prepare their installation, the Sulpician M. Robert-Michel Gay, who was the mission Lac des Deux-Montagnes' first superior, made some clearing and built various buildings including a chapel, the missionary's house, a school intended for the Sisters of the Congregation Notre-Dame as well as cabins for the Indians. The Indian population increased considerably around 1727 when the Nipissings and the Algonquins of the Île-aux-Tourtes mission also came to the Lac-des-Deux-Montagnes mission site with their missionary Pierre-Élie Déperet.

Between 1740 and 1742, seven oratories were established which are witness to the famous Calvary of Oka, work of the Sulpicians Hamon Guen and François Picquet. Francois dit Belleville (who arrived in Nouvelle-France in 1754) was the author of the bas-relief of the chapels of this pilgrimage site, which is the oldest in America. The missionary Louis-Urgel Lafontaine (1895-1930) was the last to preach in Iroquois [language] at the location. The Calvary was built by the Indians and only for them in order to evangelize them.

The church, the presbytery and the outbuildings of Oka were set on fire on 15 June 1877.

The present church was built between 1878 and 1883 according to the plans of the architects Perrault and Mesnard.

Oka crisis

In 1990, the small community gained international attention in what became known as the Oka Crisis. It had approved development of a private golf course, to add nine holes and nearby luxury housing. The Mohawk of Kanesatake opposed this.

Several years before the crisis the Mohawks had initiated and lost a land claim court case in which they tried to gain control of what they termed "historic land", land known from the early mission settlement as commons land, which including pasture land, "The Pines" forested land and a nearby aboriginal cemetery. The most recent claim had been in part rejected by the Federal courts. The Mohawks of Kanesatake initial response to the golf course development decision was to blockade a dirt road leading to "The Pines" land.

The conflict escalated from there with the Sûreté du Québec enforcing on July 11 a Provincial injunction to dismantle this first barricade, which resulted in shots being fired on both sides, one SQ officer being killed, the SQ abandoning several of their vehicles and the Mohawk Warriors erecting a new barricade this time across Route 344, the main road access to Oka and Kanesatake.

By the end of July, there were at least 1,000 people assembled in Oka's Paul-Sauvé Provincial Park in support for the Mohawks. Among them were delegations represented by Cree, Innus, Hurons-Wendats, Algonquins, Ojibwes, Micmacs and other Canadian First Nations people.

During the confrontation lasting 78 days, the Quebec Police Force (SQ) (and later Canadian Army units) confronted members of the Mohawk nation of the adjacent community of Kanesatake. The latter were joined by other Mohawk and First Nations and Native American tribes.  In addition, for several weeks, Mohawk at Kahnawake blockaded the approach to the Mercier Bridge, a route that ran through their land. Negotiations finally led to the Mohawk re-opening the road. An SQ officer Corporal Lemay was shot and killed at a period of heightened tensions. Numerous people were arrested. The disputed area was acquired by the Canadian Federal Government as had been planned before the crisis. Development was stopped.

Some in the media reported the Mohawks' opposition being based on the expansion of the golf course over what the Mohawks considered sacred land. This however was never the premise of contention. Instead, the dispute laid over persistent claims dating back to land right issues between the Sulpicians and Mohawks that related not to burial grounds or cemeteries, but to i) what was known as the commons lands including part of "The Pines", and, ii) that commenced at the onset of the British conquest, iii) the Mohawks allegiance to them, and, iv) the definite change of attitude of the Mohawks towards the French.

Demographics

Population trend:
 Population in 2011: 3,969 (2006 to 2011 population change: 20.3%)
 Population in 2006: 3,300
 Population in 2001: 3,194
 Population in 1996:
 Oka (municipality): 1 514
 Oka (parish): 1,498
 Population in 1991:
 Oka (municipality): 1,658
 Oka (parish): 1,656

Private dwellings occupied by usual residents: 1,546 (total dwellings: 1,633)

Mother tongue:
 French as first language: 92.3%
 English as first language: 4%
 English and French as first language: 1.2%
 Other as first language: 2.5%

Transportation 
Highway 344 passes through Oka. The Oka Express goes to the Deux-Montagnes station and Terminus Saint-Eustache

Attractions
In the summertime, the community's long stretch of beachfront along the Ottawa River and the Lake of Two Mountains, and its marina draw people to the area from Montreal and neighboring cities.  Another attraction is the Abbey of Notre-Dame du Lac, famous for its Oka cheese produced by Trappists monks there.

A small ferry service operates between Oka and the town of Hudson across the Ottawa River. During the winter months, a toll ice bridge provides access on this route. There is also connection with the AMT Deux-Montagnes Train to and from Montreal's Central Station and Deux-Montagnes Station by the Oka Express minibus.

Education

The Commission scolaire de la Seigneurie-des-Mille-Îles (CSSMI) operates French language public schools.

Schools include:
 École secondaire d'Oka
 École des Pins
Some portions are instead zoned to École de l'Amitié in Saint-Placide.

The Sir Wilfrid Laurier School Board (SWLSB) operates Anglophone public schools. Mountainview Elementary School and Saint Jude Elementary School, both in Deux-Montagnes, serve this community. Lake of Two Mountains High School in Deux-Montagnes is the zoned high school.

Climate
Oka has a humid continental climate (Dfb) with warm, rainy summers and long, cold winters.

References

External links

 Official Website

Municipalities in Quebec
Populated places established in 1721
Incorporated places in Laurentides
Greater Montreal
1721 establishments in the French colonial empire